The MV Oliver Cromwell was a Mississippi-style riverboat which was constructed as a Dutch barge in 1922 and converted into a riverboat hotel in 1993. As a stern Paddle steamer and served as a hotel, restaurant and cabaret venue in Gloucester Docks, Gloucester.

History

The MV Oliver Cromwell which was originally built as a Dutch barge in 1922 and was converted into a Hotel barge by English Holiday Cruises in 1993 where it travelled between Gloucester and Worcester. It was moored permanently in Gloucester Docks from 2009 as its passenger licence was not renewed. At this point it was turned into a restaurant and cabaret venue. In 2012, it was put up for sale. Out of water surveys were carried out in 2014 which showed it was structurally sound. There were several parties interested in buying the vessel throughout 2016 and in 2017, a buyer emerged paying to repaint the outside of the vessel but they could not raise the funds to complete the sale. In January 2018, a blind bidding process resulted in the vessel being sold to Crannagh Marina Complex in Coleraine.

Sinking
The Holyhead coastguard attended but were unable to prevent the sinking, the coxswain commenting "It was very sad to see such a lovely vessel sink like that, but no-one was endangered and the lack of fuel on board meant there were no environmental issues". In June 2018, an investigation by the Maritime and Coastguard Agency over the sinking of the barge took place.

References

External links

 In Gloucester Docks
 Replica Stern-Wheeler MV Oliver Cromwell Sinks in Irish Sea

1922 ships
Shipwrecks of Wales
Riverboats
Hotel barges
Ships built in the Netherlands
Shipwrecks in the Irish Sea
Maritime incidents in 2018
Gloucester Docks